Orvis is an American family-owned retail and mail-order business specializing in fly fishing, hunting and sporting goods. Founded in Manchester, Vermont, in 1856 by Charles F. Orvis to sell fishing tackle, it is the oldest mail-order retailer in the United States.

Orvis operates 70 retail stores and 10 outlet/warehouse locations in the US and 18 retail stores and one outlet store in the UK. Owned by the Perkins family since 1965, the company has changed hands twice and has had five CEOs in its history.

History

Charles F. Orvis opened a tackle shop in Manchester, Vermont, in 1856.  His 1874 fly reel was described by reel historian Jim Brown as the "benchmark of American reel design," the first fully modern fly reel.

Prior to the  Civil War Orvis was sending out catalogs, which predated more famous ones from Sears, Roebuck by more than 20 years.
Charles's daughter, Mary Orvis Marbury, took charge of the Orvis fly department in the 1870s. In 1892, she published an encyclopedic reference book on fly patterns Favorite Flies and Their Histories.

Following Charles's death in 1915, sons Albert and Robert managed the company until the 1930s, when it essentially collapsed during the Depression.  Investors, led by Philadelphia businessman-sportsman Dudley Corkran, purchased Orvis in 1939 for US$4,500 (equal to $ today), and quickly revitalized the business. Corkran hired master bamboo rodbuilder Wes Jordan, who by the late 1940s had developed a Bakelite impregnation process that made Orvis bamboo rods uniquely impervious to weather, rot, and other perennial perils.

After World War II, as fiberglass claimed the fishing rod market, Orvis competed with bamboo rod builders, such as Payne, Gillum, and Garrison, while its fiberglass and graphite rods competed with Shakespeare, Fenwick, and other emerging post-bamboo-era firms.

Purchase by the Perkins family 

In 1965 after nine months of negotiations with Corkran, Leigh H. Perkins (27 November 1927 - 7 May 2021) bought Orvis for $400,000, equal to $ today. Perkins had since his youth held an admiration for the company which he purchased using $200,000 in savings and the rest in the form of a loan. At the time the company had 20 employees and $500,000 in annual sales. 
In 1966 Perkins established the Orvis fly-fishing school in Manchester, Vermont, which is thought to have been the first of its kind in the United States. His idea was to both to democratize the world of fly casting and at the same time to expand his customer base. Eventually the company was to establish a total of seven such fishing schools.

Perkins recognized the opportunity to make Orvis synonymous not only with fly fishing but with an entire way of life, and greatly enlarged the product line in the 1980s into gifts and clothing. Described by contemporaries as a genius at mail order, Perkins pioneered the trading of customer mailing lists among his chief competitors, including L.L. Bean, Eddie Bauer and Norm Thompson.
Inspired by Perkin’s respect for working dogs the company in 1977 introduced the Orvis Dog Nest bed, which not only launched an entirely new category for the company, but which was the first of its kind sold in the United States.

Under Perkins and Jordan's successor as chief rod builder, Howard Steere, Orvis became the world's largest manufacturer of high-quality fly rods and reels.  In 1989, Tom Peters, author of In Search of Excellence, named the Orvis fly rod one of the five best products made in the United States in the 1980s. Historian Kenneth Cameron has written that Perkins' accomplishment was to "define the look of contemporary fly fishing and the entire social universe in which it fits, no small achievement."

By the time that Perkins retired in 1992 and turned Orvis over to his sons the company had grown to have annual sales of $90 million and more than 700 employees.
Under the leadership of Perkins' sons, then-CEO Leigh ("Perk") Perkins, Jr., and Executive Vice Chairman Dave Perkins, Orvis has more fully formalized- and broadened its corporate vision. Whilst Orvis has thrived and revenue has more than tripled under the second generation of Perkins leadership, a long-simmering corporate identity crisis had to be addressed: the company's growth had strained Orvis's sense of direction - e.g. between 1982 and 2000, Orvis purchased six other firms, most of whose own identities did not mesh well with Orvis and thus put the clarity of the brand at risk.
As a result beginning in 2000 a rebranding effort began to focus Orvis as a name synonymous with a distinctive, outdoor style of living.

Simon Perkins, the son of Leigh “Perk” Perkins (former Orvis CEO), and grandson of Leigh H. Perkins took over the company as president in 2020

Conservation programs 
Orvis's conservation activism began with Charles Orvis's work in fisheries conservation and management in the late 19th century and has continued since.  Leigh Perkins continued with conservationism as a company value, donating to wildlife organizations before such practices were widespread. In 1994 Perkins was recognized for his efforts when he received the Chevron Corporation's Chevron Conservation Award for lifetime achievements in conservation.

Since 1994, Orvis has annually donated five percent of its pretax profits to conservation projects in cooperation with the Atlantic Salmon Federation, Nature Conservancy, National Fish and Wildlife Foundation, the Ruffed Grouse Society, and Trout Unlimited among others.

References

Further reading 
 

Fishing equipment
Fly fishing
American companies established in 1856
Retail companies established in 1856
Clothing brands of the United States
Outdoor clothing brands
Companies based in Vermont
Sporting goods retailers of the United States
Mail-order retailers
Online retailers of the United States
1856 establishments in Vermont
Family-owned companies of the United States